Garrett Wolfe (born August 17, 1984) is a former American football running back.  He was drafted by the Bears in the third round of the 2007 NFL Draft. He played his college football at Northern Illinois.

Early years
A Chicago native, Wolfe attended Holy Cross High School in River Grove, Illinois. He rushed for 4,311 yards and 56 touchdowns during the final two years of his high school career. Wolfe set eleven school records during his tenure at Holy Cross and earned numerous honors from various Chicago media sources, including the Chicago Tribune and Chicago Sun-Times.

College career
Wolfe spent most of his first year at Northern Illinois University on the sideline. He began to make significant progress his sophomore year when he became the team's starting running back and one of the most productive rushers in the nation. Wolfe managed to solidify his performance towards the end of the 2004 season, rushing for over 2,400 yards and scoring  17 touchdowns during the last seven games of the season.

His 2005 season was almost as successful. He earned national recognition with stout performances against the Michigan Wolverines and Northwestern Wildcats. Wolfe's season was hindered by a knee injury, which forced him to miss three games. Nevertheless, his achievements were recognized with an All-American selection and by being voted the Huskies' Most Valuable Player.

Wolfe started the 2006 season on a productive note by accumulating 285 total yards (171 rushing, 114 receiving) against the Ohio State Buckeyes, who were at the time the nation's top ranked team. He finished the season with an NCAA-high 1,928 rushing yards while averaging 157 yards per game.

Statistics

Professional career

Chicago Bears
The Chicago Bears drafted Wolfe in the 2007 NFL Draft's third round, with the 93rd overall selection. On May 15, 2007 Wolfe became the first of his draft class to sign, inking a four-year deal with the Bears. Financial terms were undisclosed.

Wolfe was placed on season-ending injured reserve with a torn hamstring on December 12, 2008. He finished the 2008 season with 15 carries for 69 yards.

Wolfe became a restricted free-agent after the 2010 season, but the Bears did not offer him a contract. He remained unsigned throughout the 2011 NFL lockout.

In May 2011, Wolfe was arrested and charged with retail theft, disorderly conduct, assault of a police officer and resisting an officer with violence following an altercation at a Miami Beach nightclub. All charges against Wolfe were later dropped.

Omaha Nighthawks
In late 2011, Wolfe signed with the Omaha Nighthawks.

Montreal Alouettes
On May 14, 2012, Wolfe signed with the Montreal Alouettes.

Career statistics

See also
 List of NCAA Division I FBS career rushing touchdowns leaders
 List of NCAA major college football yearly rushing leaders

References

External links

 Chicago Bears bio
 Northern Illinois Huskies bio
 Just Sports Stats

1984 births
Living people
American football running backs
Chicago Bears players
Northern Illinois Huskies football players
Omaha Nighthawks players
Players of American football from Chicago
African-American players of American football
21st-century African-American sportspeople